Stanley Baldwin of the Conservative Party formed the second Baldwin ministry upon his reappointment as Prime Minister of the United Kingdom by King George V after the 1924 general election. His second ministry ended following the so-called "Flapper Election" of May 1929.

Cabinet

November 1924 – June 1929
Stanley Baldwin – Prime Minister and Leader of the House of Commons
The Viscount Cave – Lord High Chancellor of Great Britain
The Marquess Curzon of Kedleston – Leader of the House of Lords and Lord President of the Council
The Marquess of Salisbury – Lord Keeper of the Privy Seal
Winston Churchill – Chancellor of the Exchequer
Sir William Joynson-Hicks – Secretary of State for the Home Department
Sir Austen Chamberlain – Secretary of State for Foreign Affairs and Deputy Leader of the House of Commons
Leo Amery – Secretary of State for the Colonies
Sir Laming Worthington-Evans – Secretary of State for War
The Earl of Birkenhead – Secretary of State for India
Sir Samuel Hoare – Secretary of State for Air
Sir John Gilmour – Secretary for Scotland
William Clive Bridgeman – First Lord of the Admiralty
The Viscount Cecil of Chelwood – Chancellor of the Duchy of Lancaster
Sir Philip Cunliffe-Lister – President of the Board of Trade
Edward Frederick Lindley Wood – Minister of Agriculture
Lord Eustace Percy – President of the Board of Education
The Viscount Peel – First Commissioner of Works
Sir Arthur Steel-Maitland – Minister of Labour
Neville Chamberlain – Minister of Health
Sir Douglas Hogg – Attorney-General for England and Wales

Changes
April 1925 – On Curzon's death, Lord Balfour succeeded him as Lord President. Lord Salisbury became the new Leader of the House of Lords, remaining also Lord Privy Seal.
June 1925 – The post of Secretary of State for Dominion Affairs was created, held by Leo Amery in tandem with Secretary of State for the Colonies.
November 1925 – Walter Guinness succeeded E.F.L. Wood as Minister of Agriculture.
July 1926 – The post of Secretary of Scotland was upgraded to Secretary of State for Scotland.
October 1927 – Lord Cushendun succeeded Lord Cecil of Chelwood as Chancellor of the Duchy of Lancaster
March 1928 – Lord Hailsham (former Sir D. Hogg) succeeded Lord Cave as Lord Chancellor. Hailsham's successor as Attorney-General was not in the Cabinet.
October 1928 – Lord Peel succeeded Lord Birkenhead as Secretary of State for India. Lord Londonderry succeeded Peel as First Commissioner of Public Works

List of ministers
Members of the Cabinet are in bold face.

Notes

References

British ministries
Government
1920s in the United Kingdom
1924 establishments in the United Kingdom
1929 disestablishments in the United Kingdom
Ministries of George V
Ministry 2
Cabinets established in 1924
Cabinets disestablished in 1929
Interwar Britain